Kroos is a surname. Notable people with the surname include:

 Felix Kroos (born 1991), German footballer, younger brother of Toni
 Toni Kroos (born 1990), German footballer, older brother of Felix

See also
 Kroos (film), a documentary about Toni Kroos

Dutch-language surnames
German-language surnames